Capnodium theae is a plant pathogen that affects the leaves of the tea plant.

References

Fungal plant pathogens and diseases
Tea diseases
Eudicot diseases
Capnodiaceae
Fungi described in 1931
Taxa named by Karel Bernard Boedijn